Valea Merilor may refer to several villages in Romania:

 Valea Merilor, a village in Vultureni Commune, Bacău County
 Valea Merilor, a village in Potcoava town, Olt County